Tarjei Rygnestad (26 July 1954 – 2 February 2013) was a Norwegian physician.

He was a professor of medicine at the Norwegian University of Science and Technology and a physician at St. Olav Hospital. He had specialization in anesthesiology and clinical pharmacology. He chaired the Norwegian Board of Forensic Medicine from 2009 to his death from heart failure in February 2013.

References

1954 births
2013 deaths
Clinical pharmacologists
Norwegian pharmacologists
Academic staff of the Norwegian University of Science and Technology
Norwegian anesthesiologists